Finland—Pakistan relations refer to the bilateral relations between Finland and Pakistan. The relations were established on 12 January 1951  and for many years they were mostly focused on trade and economic co-operation. In the recent years Finland has also contributed financially to development co-operation and humanitarian aid in Pakistan, for example by making significant donations to the World Bank's Multi Donor Trust Fund for the reconstruction of the Pakistani border region. The last Finland-Pakistan political consultations were held in Helsinki in April 2014.

There is no Embassy of Pakistan in Finland, but Finnish residents may receive consular services from the Embassy of Pakistan in Stockholm. The current Honorary Consul General for Finland, Mr. Wille Eerola was appointed in February 2016 by the President of Pakistan. The Finnish Embassy in Islamabad, Pakistan, was closed in August 2012 due to budget cuts by the government  but reopened officially on 1st of September 2022. Current Ambassador, H.E. Hannu Ripatti had his credential ceremony with the President of Pakistan, Dr. Arif Alvi on October 3, 2022 in Islamabad, Pakistan, continuing to run the Embassy of Finland in Pakistan after a ten years break. 

For 2012-2022 Finland had a Roving Ambassador to South-Asia who was also in charge of the Pakistan-relations, with an emphasis on developing economic co-operation, with an office in Helsinki at the Ministry for Foreign Affairs of Finland. Currently Finland has Honorary Consulate in the city of Lahore.

The Finland Pakistan Business Council is an organisation established in 1985, registered in both Finland and Pakistan with the purpose of enhancing trade and business relationships between the two countries. Although historically bilateral trade has been rather moderate, more and more Finnish businesses are interested in the Pakistani market. A number of notable Finnish companies are present there.

See also
 Foreign relations of Finland
 Foreign relations of Pakistan

References

 
Pakistan
Bilateral relations of Pakistan